The third cabinet of Alexandru Averescu was the government of Romania from 30 March 1926 to 4 June 1927.

Ministers
The ministers of the cabinet were as follows:

President of the Council of Ministers:
Gen. Alexandru Averescu (30 March 1926 - 4 June 1927)
Minister of the Interior: 
Octavian Goga (30 March 1926 - 4 June 1927)
Minister of Foreign Affairs: 
Ion Mitilineu (30 March 1926 - 4 June 1927)
Minister of Finance:
Ion Lapedatu (30 March 1926 - 19 March 1927)
Gen. Alexandru Averescu (19 March - 4 June 1927)
Minister of Justice:
Theodor Cudalbu (30 March 1926 - 4 June 1927)
Minister of War:
Gen. Ludovic Mircescu (30 March 1926 - 4 June 1927)
Minister of Public Works:
Petru Groza (30 March - 14 July 1926)
Constantin Meissner (14 July 1926 - 4 June 1927)
Minister of Communications:
Gen. Gheorghe Văleanu (30 March 1926 - 4 June 1927)
Minister of Industry and Commerce:
Gen. Constantin Coandă (30 March - 14 July 1926)
Mihail Berlescu (14 July 1926 - 4 June 1927)
Minister of Public Instruction:
Petre P. Negulescu (30 March - 14 July 1926)
Ion Petrovici (14 July 1926 - 4 June 1927)
Minister of Religious Affairs and the Arts:
Vasile Goldiș (30 March 1926 - 4 June 1927)
Minister of Agriculture and Property:
Constantin Garoflid (30 March 1926 - 4 June 1927)
Ministry of Labour, Social Insurance and Cooperation:
Grigore Trancu-Iași (30 March 1926 - 4 June 1927)
Minister of Public Health and Social Welfare:
Ioan Lupaș (30 March 1926 - 4 June 1927)

Minister of State (Ministers without portfolio):
Sergiu Niță (30 March 1926 - 4 June 1927)
Dori Popovici (30 March 1926 - 4 June 1927)
Ion Petrovici (30 March - 14 July 1926)
Petru Groza (30 March 1926 - 4 June 1927)
Gen. Constantin Coandă (10 August - 14 November 1926), also in charge of the interim presidency of the Council of Ministers
Gen. Ioan Rășcanu (5 January - 4 June 1927), also High Commissioner of Bessarabia and Bukovina

References

Cabinets of Romania
Cabinets established in 1926
Cabinets disestablished in 1927
1926 establishments in Romania
1927 disestablishments in Romania